James Economou (born December 6, 1988) is a former American football offensive lineman. He is one of Southern Connecticut State University players who entered the AFL in 2010 as a 2009 All-American.

College career
Economou attended Southern Connecticut State University in New Haven, Connecticut. There he was a standout offensive lineman who was named an All-American, All-Region and All-Conference player. He was a starter at guard, helping lead the offense to rank second in the league in rushing and passing yards per game, and first in scoring and total offense.

Professional career

Pre-draft
Prior to the 2011 NFL Draft, Economou was projected to be undrafted by NFLDraftScout.com. He was rated as the 129th-best offensive lineman in the draft. He was not invited to the NFL Scouting Combine, he posted the following numbers during his pro-day workouts at Fordham University:

Milwaukee Mustangs
After going undrafted in the 2011 NFL Draft, Economou signed with the Milwaukee Mustangs of the Arena Football League.

Cleveland Gladiators
Economou was with the Cleveland Gladiators in 2012.

Iowa Barnstormers
Economou has re-signed with the Iowa Barnstormers for the 2013 season.

References

American football offensive linemen
1988 births
Living people
Iowa Barnstormers players
Milwaukee Mustangs (2009–2012) players
Cleveland Gladiators players
People from Coram, New York